Events in the year 1885 in Costa Rica.

Incumbents
President: Próspero Fernández Oreamuno until March 12, Bernardo Soto Alfaro

Events

Births

Deaths
March 12 - Próspero Fernández Oreamuno

References

 
Years of the 19th century in Costa Rica